The Powell River Kings are a junior "A" ice hockey team based in Powell River, British Columbia, Canada. They are members of the Coastal Conference of the British Columbia Hockey League (BCHL). They play their home games at Hap Parker Arena.

History

Powell River joined the British Columbia Junior Hockey League (BCJHL) for the start of the 1988–89 season with the name the "Paper Kings", when they assumed the Delta Flyers franchise. They dropped the "Paper" from their name for the start of the 1998–99 season.

Season-by-season record

Note: GP = Games played, W = Wins, L = Losses, T = Ties, OTL = Overtime Losses, Pts = Points, GF = Goals for, GA = Goals against, PIM = Penalties in minutes

NHL alumni
A few former players have gone on to the NHL. Brad Bombardir won a Stanley Cup with the New Jersey Devils, Jeff Hoggan was the captain of the AHL's Grand Rapids Griffins, Robb Gordon was a 2nd round draft choice of the Vancouver Canucks playing in four games, Dean Malkoc played for Vancouver and Boston, former assistant coach Cory Clouston spent four seasons as head coach of the Ottawa Senators. Other draftees are forwards Scott Kirton (Chicago), Derek Bekar (St. Louis), Matt Siddall (Atlanta), defenseman Calvin Elfring(Quebec) and goaltenders Peter Brady (Vancouver), Sean Maguire (Pittsburgh)

Brad Bombardir
Daniel Carr
Cory Clouston
Paul Crowder
Robb Gordon
Jeff Hoggan
Dean Malkoc
Clayton Stoner

Retired numbers
5 Brad Bombardir
19 Heath Dennison

Honored people
Joe Mastrodonato BUILDER

Awards and trophies

Ron Boileau Memorial Trophy (Regular Season Champions) 
 2011Cliff McNabb Memorial Trophy 2012
 2011
 2010
 2009
 1993
 1991Goaltender AwardJeff Smith 2014
Michael Garteig 2011
Pete Brady: 1997Brett Hull TrophyDarcy Oakes: 2009
Robb Gordon: 1994Joe Tennant Memorial TrophyKent Lewis 2011
Kent Lewis: 2009
Terry Perkins: 2003
Terry Perkins: 2002
Kent Lewis: 1994Bob Fenton TrophyDarcy Oakes: 2009
Adam Presizniuk: 2007
Hugo Gigeure: 1998
Shane Henry: 1990Defensive AwardCraig Dalrymple 2012
Justin Dasilva 2011
Mat Bodie: 2010
Michael Wakita: 2006Vern Dye Memorial TrophyMatt Garbowsky 2011
Pete Brady: 1997
Robb Gorden: 1994
Jay McNeill: 1992Bruce Allison Memorial TrophyMat Bodie: 2009
Calvin Elfring: 1994
Robb Gordon: 1993
Jay McNeill: 1991Wally Forslund Memorial Trophy (For goalie tandem with lowest combined goals-against average)

Michael Garteig/Sean Maguire 2011
Sean Maguire/Jonah Imoo 2012

See also
List of ice hockey teams in British Columbia

References

External links
 Official website of the Powell River Kings
 Official website of the BCHL

British Columbia Hockey League teams
Ice hockey teams in British Columbia
Powell River, British Columbia
1976 establishments in British Columbia
Ice hockey clubs established in 1976